The  is the smallest Daibutsu (Buddhist statue) in Japan. It is located in the city of Kamagaya, Chiba Prefecture, to the north of Tokyo.

History
The Kamagaya Daibutsu was commissioned by a wealthy local merchant, Okuniya Fukuda Bunemon, to pray for the souls of his ancestors. It was cast by Tagawa Shuzen, a noted foundry smith of Kanda in Edo and It was completed in November 1776. It became the symbol of Kamagaya, and was protected by local residents against the movement to eradicate Buddhism of the early Meiji period, and against efforts by the government to collect all available bronze for the war effort in World War II. It was designated as a cultural property of Kamagaya City in 1972. The statue remains property of the Fukuda family.

Measurements 
 Total Height: 
 Height of Statue: 
 Height of Base:

Access
From Funabashi Station, board a bus towards Kamagaya-Daibutsu via Futawamichi (or board one towards Kamagaya-Daibutsu via Misaki Station). Alight at "Kamagaya-Daibutsu", the final stop.

The nearest train station is Kamagaya-Daibutsu Station (Shin-Keisei Line). It takes approximately 24 minutes from Matsudo Station, 17 minutes from Shin-Tsudanuma Station and 21 minutes from Keisei-Tsudanuma Station.

It is approximately one minute's walk from the Kamagaya-Daibutsu Station.

References

External links
Aerial view

Buildings and structures in Chiba Prefecture
Tourist attractions in Chiba Prefecture
Colossal Buddha statues in Japan
Bronze Buddha statues
Outdoor sculptures in Japan
Kamagaya